Eldee Young (January 7, 1936 – February 12, 2007) was a jazz double-bass and cello player who performed in the cool jazz, post bop and rhythm and blues mediums.

Born in 1936 in Chicago, Illinois, Young started playing upright bass at the age of 13. He was helped by his eldest brother who played guitar. He joined the Ramsey Lewis Trio in 1955. After a decade together he split along with bandmate, Isaac "Red" Holt to form the Young-Holt Trio. They changed their name to Young-Holt Unlimited in 1968. After they split in 1974, Young continued playing, mainly with small groups in Chicago.

He also played with pianist Jeremy Monteiro for more than 20 years. Young also appeared on the albums of James Moody and Eden Atwood, among others.

Young died in Bangkok, Thailand, from a heart attack at age 71.

Discography

With Ramsey Lewis
Ramsey Lewis and his Gentle-men of Swing (Argo, 1956)
Ramsey Lewis and his Gentle-men of Jazz (Argo, 1956)
Lem Winchester and the Ramsey Lewis Trio (Argo, 1958) - with Lem Winchester
Down to Earth (EmArcy, 1958)
An Hour with the Ramsey Lewis Trio (Argo, 1959)
Stretching Out (Argo, 1960)
The Ramsey Lewis Trio in Chicago (Argo, 1960)
More Music from the Soil (Argo, 1961)
Never on Sunday (Argo, 1961)
Sound of Christmas (Argo, 1961)
The Sound of Spring (Argo, 1962)
Country Meets the Blues (Argo, 1962)
Bossa Nova (Argo, 1962)
Pot Luck (Argo, 1963)
Barefoot Sunday Blues (Argo, 1963)
Bach to the Blues (Argo, 1964)
The Ramsey Lewis Trio at the Bohemian Caverns (Argo, 1964)
More Sounds of Christmas (Argo, 1964)
You Better Believe Me (Argo, 1964–65) - with Jean DuShon
The In Crowd (Argo, 1965)
Hang On Ramsey! (Argo, 1965)
The Groover (Cadet, 1965 [1972])
Wade in the Water (Cadet, 1966)

Ramsey Lewis Reunion (Columbia, 1980)

With Lorez Alexandria

Early in the Morning (Argo, 1960)
With Redd Holt

With James Moody
Hey! It's James Moody (Argo, 1959)

References

External links
AllAboutJazz
"Eldee Young", The History Makers

1936 births
2007 deaths
Musicians from Chicago
American jazz double-bassists
Male double-bassists
Cool jazz double-bassists
Post-bop double-bassists
Cadet Records artists
American Conservatory of Music alumni
20th-century American musicians
Jazz musicians from Illinois
20th-century double-bassists
20th-century American male musicians
American male jazz musicians